Carl Wilson (born 31 May 1967) is an Australian swimmer. He competed in two events at the 1988 Summer Olympics.

References

External links
 

1967 births
Living people
Australian male backstroke swimmers
Olympic swimmers of Australia
Swimmers at the 1988 Summer Olympics
Place of birth missing (living people)
Commonwealth Games medallists in swimming
Commonwealth Games bronze medallists for Australia
Swimmers at the 1986 Commonwealth Games
20th-century Australian people
Medallists at the 1986 Commonwealth Games